Tom Stevens is an American politician who has served in the Vermont House of Representatives since 2009.

References

Living people
Boston University alumni
21st-century American politicians
Democratic Party members of the Vermont House of Representatives
Year of birth missing (living people)